The badminton men's singles tournament at the 2002 Asian Games in Busan took place from 10 November to 14 November at Gangseo Gymnasium.

Schedule
All times are Korea Standard Time (UTC+09:00)

Results

Final

Top half

Bottom half

References
 2002 Asian Games Official Website
 2002 Asian Games Official Report, Pages 262

Men's singles